Wings of Eagles or On Wings of Eagles may refer to:

 On Wings of Eagles, a 1983 non-fiction thriller by Ken Follett
 On Wings of Eagles (miniseries), a 1986 TV adaptation
 The Wings of Eagles, a 1957 American film
 Operation On Wings of Eagles, the exodus of Yemenite Jews to Israel 1949–1950 
 "On Eagle's Wings", a Christian hymn
 Wings of Eagles (horse) (foaled 2014), a Thoroughbred racehorse
  Wings of Eagles (Elmira Corning Regional Airport), a museum

See also
 
 
 On the Wings of an Eagle (disambiguation), including "Wings of an Eagle"
 Eagle Wing (disambiguation)
 Kanfei Nesharim (disambiguation)